Yanworth is a small rural parish located in the county of Gloucestershire, England 14 miles south east of Cheltenham and 88 miles North West of London. It has a population of 300, decreasing to 112 at the 2011 census.  The village itself is part of the Stowell Park estate owned by Lord (Sam) Vestey.  St Michael's church is set apart from the village and dates to about 1200.

References

External links

Villages in Gloucestershire
Cotswold District